Bisaltes argentiniensis is a species of beetle in the family Cerambycidae. It was described by Breuning in 1971.

References

argentiniensis
Beetles described in 1971